Asmahan Bitar is a Lebanese voice actress.

Filmography

Animated series 
Angel's Friends : Raf
1001 Nights - Donyazad
Winx Club : Stella (Rai Dub Season 1–3)
Totally Spies : Clover

Anime 
Little Women
Pokémon Journeys : Jessie, Cynthia

Live action series 
Prophet Joseph - Asenath

References

External links 

Asmahan Bitar at ElCinema

Lebanese voice actresses
Place of birth missing (living people)
Living people
Year of birth missing (living people)